Bayley Fritsch (born 6 December 1996) is a professional Australian rules footballer playing for the Melbourne Football Club in the Australian Football League (AFL). Considered a late bloomer, he missed out on selection with the Eastern Ranges in the TAC Cup as a junior. After winning the league rising star in the Eastern Football League, he joined the Casey Scorpions in the Victorian Football League (VFL) where he spent three seasons. The 2017 VFL season saw him win the Fothergill–Round Medal, play for Victoria in the state representative match, be named in the VFL Team of the Year, and finish runner-up in the league-leading goalkicker and Casey's best and fairest award. His season saw him drafted by the Melbourne Football Club in the second round of the 2017 AFL draft and he made his AFL debut in the opening round of the 2018 AFL season. It was reported in 2022 that he is dating Natalie Perin.

Early life
Fritsch was born to Pauline and Scott Fritsch on 6 December 1996. After missing out on selection with the Eastern Ranges in the TAC Cup, he played twenty-two games from 2013 to 2014 with the Coldstream Football Club seniors in the Eastern Football League, a club which his father played a record 360 games and his grandparents, Dianne and John Jefcott, are life members. At seventeen years of age, he was named the league rising star for division three and four for the 2014 season in which he played twelve games and kicked forty-one goals for the under 19s, and ten games and thirty-two goals for the seniors. He then joined the Casey Scorpions (now known as the Casey Demons) in the Victorian Football League (VFL) at the start of the 2015 season, but experienced two injury-plagued seasons with a back fracture in 2015 and a knee injury in 2016.

Fritsch enjoyed continuity in the 2017 VFL season when he played nineteen matches and kicked forty-two goals for the season to finish as the runner-up in the Jim 'Frosty' Miller Medal as the VFL leading goalkicker. His performances for the first half of the season saw him selected for Victoria in a state representative match against Western Australia and he was named in Victoria's best players by The Leader and The Courier. His first injury-free season at Casey saw him receive the Fothergill–Round Medal as the VFL's best young player and he was named on the half-forward flank in the VFL Team of the Year. Furthermore, he finished second in Casey's best and fairest behind then- player, Jack Trengove. Towards the end of the season, he was being touted as a potential AFL draftee when he was one of ten VFL players invited to the Victoria combine, with Casey Demons coach, Justin Plapp, saying Fritsch could become a "serious player" in the AFL if given the chance.

AFL career
Fritsch was recruited by the Melbourne Football Club, Casey's AFL affiliate team, with their second pick and thirty-first overall in the 2017 national draft. A few days after the draft, it was announced his guernsey number would be 31, which was made famous by Australian Football Hall of Fame legend and Melbourne Hall of Fame legend, Ron Barassi, a six-time premiership player with the club. He competed for Melbourne for the first time in the AFLX competition, in which he kicked three goals in the second match with the Herald Sun's Glenn McFarlane writing the early glimpse of Fritsch showed he has strong composure in attack. He played in both of Melbourne's JLT Community Series matches and after the first match, in which he kicked three goals and was the standout player according to Fox Sports Australia's Riley Beveridge, widespread media were noting he was a strong chance to make his AFL debut in round 1. Fristch played a significant role in Melbourne's 2021 Grand Final premiership win by kicking 6 goals, becoming the first player to kick 6 goals in a Grand Final since Adelaide's Darren Jarman in 1997 and earning himself 10 Norm Smith Medal votes placing him second best on ground.

Playing style
Described as a classy player by The Leader's Paul Amy, Fritsch is a high-marking forward and has a "penetrating left-foot with sure ball handling." With ESPN's Christopher Doerre writing he is untapped and "has the scope to develop into anything," Fox Sport Australia journalist, Riley Beveridge, further stated that he has the ability to add immediate X-factor.

Statistics
Updated to the end of the 2022 season.

|-
| 2018 ||  || 31
| 23 || 17 || 12 || 236 || 138 || 374 || 121 || 59 || 0.7 || 0.5 || 10.3 || 6.0 || 16.3 || 5.3 || 2.6 || 0
|-
| 2019 ||  || 31
| 22 || 20 || 16 || 246 || 118 || 364 || 132 || 39 || 0.9 || 0.7 || 11.2 || 5.4 || 16.5 || 6.0 || 1.8 || 4
|- 
| 2020 ||  || 31
| 16 || 22 || 24 || 128 || 48 || 176 || 81 || 17 || 1.4 || 1.5 || 8.0 || 3.0 || 11.0 || 5.1 || 1.1 || 1
|-
| scope=row bgcolor=F0E68C | 2021# ||  || 31
| 24 || 59 || 24 || 190 || 54 || 244 || 116 || 47 || 2.5 || 1.0 || 7.9 || 2.3 || 10.2 || 4.8 || 2.0 || 3
|- 
| 2022 ||  || 31
| 24 || 55 || 22 || 169 || 60 || 229 || 90 || 37 || 2.3 || 0.9 || 7.0 || 2.5 || 9.5 || 3.8 || 1.5 || 0
|- class=sortbottom
! colspan=3 | Career
! 109 !! 173 !! 98 !! 969 !! 418 !! 1387 !! 540 !! 199 !! 1.6 !! 0.9 !! 8.9 !! 3.8 !! 12.7 !! 5.0 !! 1.8 !! 8
|}

Notes

Honours and achievements
Team
 AFL premiership player: 2021
 McClelland Trophy: 2021

Individual
 3× Melbourne leading goalkicker: 2020, 2021, 2022
 Harold Ball Memorial Trophy: 2018
 Fothergill–Round–Mitchell Medal: 2017

References

External links

1996 births
Living people
Melbourne Football Club players
Casey Demons players
Australian rules footballers from Victoria (Australia)
Melbourne Football Club Premiership players
One-time VFL/AFL Premiership players